Safety Provisions (Building) Convention, 1937 is  an International Labour Organization Convention.

It was established in 1937:
Considering that building work gives rise to serious accident risks which it is necessary to reduce both on humanitarian and on economic grounds, and

Having decided upon the adoption of certain proposals with regard to safety provisions for workers in the building industry with reference to scaffolding and hoisting machinery,...

Ratifications and denunciations
As of January 2023, the convention had been ratified by 30 states. However, eleven of the ratifying states have automatically denounced the treaty because of subsequent ratification of conventions that automatically trigger denunciation of the 1937 treaty.

External links 
Text.
Ratifications.

Health treaties
International Labour Organization conventions
Occupational safety and health treaties
Treaties concluded in 1937
Treaties entered into force in 1942
Treaties of Belgium
Treaties of the People's Republic of Bulgaria
Treaties of Burundi
Treaties of the Central African Republic
Treaties of the Republic of the Congo (Léopoldville)
Treaties of Egypt
Treaties of the French Fourth Republic
Treaties of Greece
Treaties of Guinea
Treaties of Honduras
Treaties of Ireland
Treaties of Malta
Treaties of Mauritania
Treaties of the Netherlands
Treaties of Peru
Treaties of the Polish People's Republic
Treaties of Rwanda
Treaties of Francoist Spain
Treaties of Suriname
Treaties of Switzerland
Treaties of Tunisia
Construction law
1937 in labor relations